Fan Lei may refer to:

Fan Lei (clarinetist) (born 1965), Chinese-American clarinetist
Fan Lei (table tennis) (born 1983), Chinese para table tennis player

See also
 Fan (disambiguation)
 Lei (disambiguation)
 Lei Fang (レイファン), Koei Tecmo Dead or Alive video game character
 Fang Lei (房蕾), Chinese singer
 Lei Feng (雷锋), Chinese PLA soldier